Trihydroxybenzoic acid may refer to the following phenolic acids:
 Gallic acid (3,4,5-trihydroxybenzoic acid)
 Phloroglucinol carboxylic acid (2,4,6-trihydroxybenzoic acid)

O-methylated trihydroxybenzoic acids are:
 Eudesmic acid
 Syringic acid

Glycosides:
 Theogallin